The Casselman Wind Power Project is a wind farm in Somerset County, Pennsylvania with 23 GE 1.5 MW Wind Turbines that began commercial operation in 2007. The wind farm has a combined total nameplate capacity of 34.5 megawatts, but actually produces about 90,666 megawatt-hours of electricity annually. The wind farm was developed by PPM Energy and constructed by Iberdrola, based in Spain. Power produced at the wind farm is distributed by First Energy.

Eight of the project's 23 wind turbines sit atop a rehabilitated surface mine. In addition, the former mining site also hosts the wind farm's operation center, collector transformer and interconnection facility.

See also 

Wind power in Pennsylvania

References

External links
 Casselman Wind Power Project, Iberdrola Renewables
 GE Wind 1.5 MW Series Wind Turbine

Energy infrastructure completed in 2007
Buildings and structures in Somerset County, Pennsylvania
Wind farms in Pennsylvania